= Alex Karonias =

British rugby union player

Alexander Karonias is a British former professional rugby union player who made 97 appearances for London Scottish between 2008 and 2014.
